Abdelaziz "Aziz" Khalouta (born 8 August 1989) is a Dutch-Moroccan professional footballer who plays for Tweede Divisie side De Treffers.

References

External links
 Voetbal International profile 
 

1989 births
Living people
Dutch footballers
VVV-Venlo players
Fortuna Sittard players
CS Pandurii Târgu Jiu players
FC Den Bosch players
De Treffers players
Eerste Divisie players
Tweede Divisie players
Liga I players
Dutch expatriate footballers
Expatriate footballers in Romania
People from Fez, Morocco

Association football midfielders